Lueders or Lüders is a surname, and may refer to:

Alexander von Lüders (1790– 1874), Russian general
Gerhart Lüders (1920-1995), German theoretical physicist 
Heinrich Lüders (1869-1943), German Orientalist and Indologist 
Jack Lueders-booth (born 1935), American photographer
Lauren Lueders (born 1987), American basketball player
Marie Elisabeth Lüders (1878-1966), German politician and women's rights activist
Pierre Lueders (born 1970), Canadian Olympic, world and World Cup champion bobsledder

See also
Lueders, Texas
Lüders band in metals
Luders Affair in Haiti, 1897
Lüder, Germany